Evansport is an unincorporated community in northern Tiffin Township, Defiance County, Ohio, United States.  It has a post office with the ZIP code 43519.

History
Evansport was platted in 1835 by Albert G. and Amos Evans, and named for them. A post office has been in operation at Evansport since 1837.

References

Unincorporated communities in Ohio
Unincorporated communities in Defiance County, Ohio